"Honey" is a song by American singer and songwriter Kehlani. It was released on October 6, 2017. They first performed the song live at [[Billboard Women in Music|Billboard'''s Women in Music 2017]]. The official music video was released on December 4, 2017.

 Background 
"Honey" was written by Kehlani and produced by Geoffro. Kehlani said the song was made using a Geoffro guitar loop with their best friends. The song was written for their lover, and sees Kehlani using romance as an escape and to let their pain go.

 Music video 
The song's accompanying music video premiered on December 4, 2017 on Kehlani's YouTube account. The music video was directed by David Camarena.

 Critical reception 
In 2019, Billboard'' included the song in its list of the "30 Lesbian Love Songs".

Certifications

References 

Kehlani songs
2017 songs
LGBT-related songs
Songs written by Kehlani
Atlantic Records singles